The Mercedes-Benz MRA platform (Modular Rear Architecture) is an automobile platform made by Mercedes-Benz since 2013.
First car is the 2014 Mercedes-Benz S-Class (W222).

Vehicles

First generation MRA 
 2013–2020 Mercedes-Benz S-Class (W222 / V222)
 2014–2021 Mercedes-Benz C-Class (W205 / S205)
 2015–2021 Mercedes-Benz C-Class (C205 / A205)
 2015–2021 Mercedes-Maybach S-Class (X222)
 2015–present Mercedes-Benz GLC-Class (X253 / C253)
 2016–present Mercedes-Benz E-Class (W213 / S213)
 2016–present Mercedes-Benz E-Class (C213 / A213)
 2016–present Mercedes-Benz E-Class (V213)
 2018–present Mercedes-Benz CLS-Class (C257)
 2018–present Mercedes-AMG GT 4-Door Coupé (X290)

Second generation MRA 2
 2021–present Mercedes-Benz S-Class (W223 / V223)
 2022–present Mercedes-Maybach S-Class (Z223)
 2022–present Mercedes-Benz C-Class (W206)
 2022–present Mercedes-Benz GLC-Class (X254)
 2023–present Mercedes-Benz E-Class (W214)

References